Jože Možina (born 7 April 1968) is a Slovenian historian, sociologist and journalist. Jože Možina was born in 1968 in Šempeter pri Novi Gorici, Slovenia.

Film and TV 
He is the author of many documentaries and broadcasts on RTV Slovenia. In most of his films he studies charity and remote states, biographical films and crimes of political systems (for example, post-war killings in Yugoslavia). He received numerous awards for his work, including at the 2012 ITN Distribution Film and New Media Festival in Hollywood for a film about Pedro Opeka.

He is also the editor and presenter of several shows on RTV Slovenija (Intervju, Pričevalci...). Between 2006 and 2010, he was also the director of TV Slovenia.

References 

1968 births
20th-century Slovenian historians
Living people
21st-century Slovenian historians